The 1884–85 season was the second season Stoke took part in the FA Cup; they, however, withdrew at the first qualifying round.

Season review
Stoke were drawn to play Scottish side Queens Park away; however, the directors were unhappy about having to pay the full travel costs and so decided to withdraw from the match.

FA Cup

Staffordshire Senior Cup

References

Stoke City F.C. seasons
Stoke